"Circles" (also released as "Circles (Instant Party)", "Instant Party (Circles)" and "Instant Party") is a song by the Who. The song, initially planned to be a Who single, saw a complicated release history. There are versions produced by the Who and by Shel Talmy.

Background
"Circles" was written as an attempt to find a different sound after the band's debut album, My Generation. Upon finding out from Pete Townshend that bassist John Entwistle could play trumpet, the band's manager, Kit Lambert, decided to allow the band to try creating a song featuring Entwistle's horns:

Release
"Circles", backed with "Instant Party Mixture", was originally planned for release as the follow-up single to the band's smash hit "My Generation", on the Brunswick label, in February 1966. However, the band secretly broke their contract with producer Shel Talmy soon after the January recordings, and re-recorded the song as the B-side to their new UK single "Substitute". To get Talmy in court as soon as possible, and to ensure the new record could be sold, "Circles" was chosen as the B-side so that Talmy could claim breach of copyright. However, management released the single with the name "Instant Party" as the B-side, in the hope that only copies with "Circles" listed would be withdrawn.

Talmy quickly took legal action against the band for breaking their contract with him, as well as breach of contract over the use of a song he had originally produced for them. This led to the court not only stopping all sales of the single, regardless of the B-side label, but also placing a recording ban on the Who until the end of the proceedings, meaning the single could not be sold. This prompted Kit Lambert or Robert Stigwood to ask Ginger Baker if his band had any instrumentals recorded that they could use, to get around the ban. They had, and he sold the untitled track for £500. The following week, Substitute was back on sale with the now named "Waltz for a Pig", the instrumental by the Graham Bond Organisation on the B-side, credited to the Who Orchestra. The court action was settled on 25 March. Townshend later said of the legal action Talmy took against the group:

After the ban was lifted, all three versions of the single – with "Circles" / "Instant Party" on the B-side as well as the new "Waltz for a Pig" – could be found in stores. It would appear that "Waltz" was the most common found copy. The first version of the song was included as the closing track on their first US album The Who Sings My Generation, substituting "I'm a Man".  The second version of "Circles" was also released on the band's EP, Ready Steady Who in November 1966, as well as on some European releases as the B-side to "Dogs". This version of the song did not see an official US release until the 1987 rarities album Two's Missing. When Substitute was released as a single in the US, the only B-side was "Waltz for a Pig".

A home demo version recorded by Townshend appeared on his 1983 solo compilation release Scoop.

The song "Instant Party Mixture", which was originally meant to be the B-side to "Circles", was finally released as a bonus track on the 2002 reissue of the My Generation album.

Covers
In 1966, the English band The Fleur de Lys released their version (Immediate Records IM032) produced by Jimmy Page.
The song was also covered and released as a B-side in 1992 by Cell.

References

1966 songs
Song recordings produced by Shel Talmy
Songs written by Pete Townshend
The Who songs
1966 singles
Immediate Records singles